Liisa Lilleste (born 18 April 1985) is an Estonian footballer.

She was born in Pärnu. In 2006 she graduated from Estonian Academy of Security Sciences's Police College, and 2016, from Tallinn University with a degree psychology.

She began her football career at JK Pärnu, coached by Tormi Raid. 2004–2007 she was a member of Estonia women's national football team.

References

Living people
1985 births
Estonian women's footballers
Tallinn University alumni
Sportspeople from Pärnu
Women's association footballers not categorized by position